Victoria Peak is a hill on the western half of Hong Kong Island. It is also known as Mount Austin, and locally as The Peak only generally. It is a major tourist attraction offering views of Central, Victoria Harbour, Lamma Island and the surrounding islands.

The summit of Victoria Peak is occupied by a radio telecommunications facility and is closed to the public. The surrounding area of public parks, tourist facilities and high-value residential land is the area that is normally meant by the name The Peak. The Peak also refers to Victoria Peak itself and its nearby areas, including Victoria Gap, Mount Kellett and Mount Gough. Sometimes Bowen Hill may also be included.

Victoria Peak is only one of the most expensive residential areas in Hong Kong, but not the most expensive compared to Deep Water Bay and Jardine's Lookout.

History

As early as the 19th century, the Peak attracted prominent European residents because of its panoramic view over the city and its temperate climate compared to the sub-tropical climate in the rest of Hong Kong. The sixth Governor of Hong Kong, Sir Richard MacDonnell had a summer residence built on the Peak circa 1868. Those that built houses named them whimsically, such as The Eyrie, and the Austin Arms.

These original residents reached their homes by sedan chairs, which were carried up and down the steep slope of Victoria Peak. This limited development of the Peak until the opening of the Peak Tram funicular in 1888.

The boost to accessibility caused by the opening of the Peak Tram created demand for residences on the Peak. Between 1904 and 1930, the Peak Reservation Ordinance designated the Peak as an exclusive residential area reserved for non-Chinese. They also reserved the Peak Tram for the use of such passengers during peak periods. The Peak remains an upmarket residential area, although residency today is based on wealth.

In 1905, construction of the Pinewood Battery was completed on the western side of the Peak. Harlech Road was constructed around the Peak as a means of resupply to this artillery and later anti-aircraft battery.

During 1904 and 1947, Chinese people were not allowed to live on the Peak according to the Peak District Reservation Ordinance when Hong Kong was a colony. In the 1920s Robert Hotung was the first Chinese person to live on the Peak because at the time he was considered mixed-race. Ho Tung Gardens located at 75 Peak Road, was owned by Robert Hotung for decades, until it was sold in 2015 for HK$5.1 billion or HK$82,258 per sq.ft.

Historically, apart from houses owned by the government, banks and corporations and lived by their officials and chairmen, the Peak also had some multi-block estates, with medium-sized flats used as housing for more junior staff. These are located on less prestigious streets, such as Guildford Road and Mount Kellett Road, which face Southside instead of Victoria Harbour.

In November 1996 businessman Wong Yuk Kwan paid HK$540 million for a house at 23 Severn Road called 'Genesis,' which was built in the 1980s by Heung Chi-kau. Another house Wong bought was 10-18 Pollock's Path, known as 'Skyhigh.' Owned by HSBC and lived by the bank's Chairmen, Skyhigh was sold to Kazuo Wada, the president of Yaohan, for HK$85 million in early 1990s. Because Yaohan went bankrupt, Kazuo Wada sold to businessman Wong Yuk Kwan for HK$370 million. In 2004, after SARS, actor Stephen Chow bought Skyhigh, and brought in Ryoden Development as a joint venture partner to rebuild the land into four houses. Genesis was sold by creditors in 2001 for HK$240m, less than 50% of what Wong Kwan paid.

These property transactions at the Peak were desperate sale by cash-strapped businessmen during economic crisis.

Changes in neighbourhood 
Some large houses on The Peak with historic values, including homes of consulates, and government buildings were demolished over the decades and redeveloped into smaller houses within managed complexes. In 2006, Sun Hung Kai Properties paid HK$1.8b, or 42,196 per sq.ft. through a government auction for a plot at 12 Mount Kellett Road, where there were blocks of flats as housing for medium-grade officials. In 2022, a house at the complex 'Twelve Peaks' at 12 Mount Kellett Road was sold by the creditors of HNA Chairman Chen Feng, whose business in mainland China was bankrupt, for HK$390m, or HK$91,959 per sq. ft. Chen Feng paid HK$506m in 2016 or HK$119,323 per sq.ft.

Despite record-breaking transactions reported by international news, In fact, The Peak is not the most expensive residential area in Hong Kong. Deep Water Bay and Jardine's Lookout are also one of the most expensive residential areas. A house at 75 Deep Water Bay Road, near Li Ka-shing's home, was sold by Pan Sutong for HK$3.3b, or HK$240,000 per sq.ft., Cheung Chung-kiu, Chairman of CC Land, purchased 1 Purves Road, Jardine's Lookout for about HK$760 million, or around HK$100,000 per square foot.  In 2018, a site on Perkins Road, Jardine's Lookout, was sold for HK$145,000 per sq.ft. Transactions of these two houses that do not face harbour views indicate a few with harbour views in Jardine's Lookout are valued at 

Another benchmark for measuring values is the annual published figures by the government's rating and valuation department, based on estimated rental values, although such properties are not rented out to third parties. In 2019, Joseph Lau Luen-hung's residence at Goldsmith Road ranked the fifth. In 2018, this house was reportedly by Apple Daily to be worth HK$2.5 billion. Translating into HK$250,000 based on inside area of around 10,000 square feet, its value surpasses all single houses in Hong Kong. Figures published in 2021 included 35 Barker Road, owned by Lee Shau-kee and a house on Mount Nicholson among the top five most valuable houses. However, 35 Barker Road consists of three houses, and so it should not be compared to other houses.

Hong Kong's richest tycoons including Li Ka-shing, Sun Hung Kai Properties' Kwok family, Joseph Lau Luen-hung live in Deep Water Bay and Jardine's Lookout and not the Peak. There are no apartment buildings, hospitals and schools close to their houses. The Peak has a diverse mix of apartment buildings and houses, and as a tourist destination, also has hospitals, schools and malls.  Many properties are also owned for rental purposes typically occupied by expatriate. The Mount Austin is a complex owned by Nan Fung Group with apartments of sizes ranging from 696 sq.ft.

Barker Road is one of the most desirable streets because it is located below the level where harbour views are not affected during foggy seasons. In 2010, Lee Shau Kee, Chairman of Henderson Land Development, bought a site at 35 Barker Road for HK$1.82b and rebuilt into three houses as his family's dwellings after originally living in a penthouse on Mid-levels. In 2015, Alibaba's founder Jack Ma bought a house on Barker Road for HK$1.5b or HK$150,000 per sq.ft.

In 2020, developer The Wharf (Holdings) bought a plot at Mansfield Road on the Peak for HK$12b or HK$46,300 per sq. ft. through government auction. This site is one of the last plots of sites owned by the Hong Kong Government used previously as accommodation for civil servants.

Ecology
The Peak is home to many species of birds, most prominently the black kite, and numerous species of butterflies. Wild boar and porcupines are also seen on Peak, along with a variety of snakes.

Tourism

With some seven million visitors every year, the Peak is a major tourist attraction of Hong Kong. It has views of the city and its waterfront. The viewing deck also has coin-operated telescopes that the visitors can use to enjoy the cityscape. The number of visitors led to the construction of two major leisure and shopping centres, the Peak Tower and the Peak Galleria, situated adjacent to each other.

The Peak Tower incorporates the upper station of the Peak Tram, the funicular railway that brings passengers up from the St. John's Anglican Cathedral in Hong Kong's Central district, whilst the Peak Galleria incorporates the bus station used by the Hong Kong public buses and green minibuses on the Peak. The Peak is also accessible by taxi and private car via the circuitous Peak Road, or by walking up the steep Old Peak Road from near the Zoological Botanical Gardens or the Central Green Trail from Hong Kong Park. The nearest MTR station is Central.

Victoria Peak Garden is located on the site of Mountain Lodge, the Governor's old summer residence, and is the closest publicly accessible point to the summit. Another popular walk is the level loop along Lugard and Harlech Roads, giving good views of the entire Hong Kong Harbour and Kowloon, as well as Lantau and Lamma Islands, encircling the summit at the level of the Peak Tower.

There are several restaurants on Victoria Peak, most of which are located in the two shopping centres. However, the Peak Lookout Restaurant, is housed in an older and more traditional building which was originally a spacious house for engineers working on the Peak Tramway. It was rebuilt in 1901 as a stop area for sedan chairs, but was re-opened as a restaurant in 1947.

Official residences
The Peak is home to a few other key officials in Hong Kong:
 19 Severn Road – residence of the Secretary for Justice
 Victoria House and Victoria Flats at 15 Barker Road – residence of the Chief Secretary for Administration
 Headquarters House 11 Barker Road – residence of the Commander of PLA Forces in Hong Kong and former home of the Commander-in-Chief of British Forces
 Chief Justice's House 18 Gough Hill Road – residence of the Chief Justice of the Court of Final Appeal

Education
Victoria Peak is in Primary One Admission (POA) School Net 11.

German Swiss International School maintains a campus on Victoria Peak.

Alternative names

Cityscape

Climate

See also

 List of places in Hong Kong
 List of mountains, peaks and hills in Hong Kong
 List of places named after Queen Victoria
 The Peak Hotel, a hotel located on Victoria Peak from 1888 to 1936
 Peak District Reservation Ordinance 1904
 Tourism in Hong Kong

References

External links

 Photos of Victoria Peak at official Hong Kong tourism website

 
Victoria Peak
Central and Western District, Hong Kong
Hong Kong Island
Restricted areas of Hong Kong red public minibus
Tourist attractions in Hong Kong